Seruyan Kuala Pembuang Airport  is an airport serving the city of Kuala Pembuang in the Seruyan Regency, in the Central Kalimantan province of Indonesia.

Airlines and destinations
The following destinations are served from Seruyan Kuala Pembuang Airport:

References

Airports in Central Kalimantan